Days Aweigh is the second studio album by American jazz singer Cassandra Wilson. It was originally released on the JMT label in 1987 and later rereleased on Winter & Winter.

Reception
Allmusic's Scott Yanow awarded the album 3 stars and stated that "this is advanced free funk dance music." A reviewer of Dusty Groove wrote: "A haunting set from Cassandra Wilson – freely creative, and a good example of the way that she was one of the few singers pushing the boundaries of jazz vocal expression in the 80s! The set's never too over the top, but it does feature lots of artful touches on the instrumentation – and in the way that Wilson chooses and sings her material. There's a slight bit of a New York downtown edge to the record, although the performance is relatively straightforward overall."

Track listing
All tracks composed by Cassandra Wilson; except where indicated
 "Electromagnolia" (Olu Dara, Cassandra Wilson) – 4:45
 "Let's Face the Music and Dance" (Irving Berlin) – 2:31
 "Days Aweigh" (Jean-Paul Bourelly) – 3:27
 "Subatomic Blues"  – 4:34
 "Apricots on Their Wings" (Henry Threadgill) – 5:49
 "If You Only Know How"  – 5:07
 "You Belong to You"  – 4:55
 "Some Other Time" (Leonard Bernstein, Betty Comden, Adolph Green) – 5:12
 "Black and Yellow" (Rod Williams) – 5:38

Personnel
Cassandra Wilson – vocals, guitar
Jean-Paul Bourelly – guitar
Steve Coleman – percussion, saxophone
Mark Johnson – drums
Olu Dara – cornet, vocals
Graham Haynes – trumpet
Kenny Davis – bass
Kevin Bruce – bass
Rod Williams – piano, synthesizer
Production notes:
Steve Coleman – producer
Cassandra Wilson – producer
Stefan F. Winter – executive producer
Joe Marciano – engineer
Adrian Von Ripka – mastering
Henry Threadgill – arranger
Joseph Gasu Rittenberg – photography, cover design
Günter Mattei – cover design

References

1987 albums
Cassandra Wilson albums
Winter & Winter Records albums
JMT Records albums